Leffrinckoucke is a commune in the Nord department in northern France.

Heraldry

Population

Twin towns

Leffrinckoucke is twinned with:
  Węgorzewo in Poland

In popular culture
The end scenes of the film Rosalie Blum were filmed at Leffrinckoucke in May 2015.

See also
Communes of the Nord department

References

Communes of Nord (French department)
French Flanders